Robert Delford Newbigging (1934–2012) was a Canadian artist, visual arts teacher, children's author, whose bronze-fashioned works have been showcased in art galleries across Europe and North America. Newbigging is best known for facilitating the project concept, development and creation of Toronto's Alexander Wood statue.

Authorship 
Popularly known by the nickname Del Newbigging, the Listowel, Ontario native was author and illustrator of Robert Rat Has A Problem, a children's book teaching the significance of agreeing to disagree and the importance of nutrition.

Medallist 
On July 16, 2000, Newbigging co-founded the Medallic Art Society of Canada (MASC), an organization "dedicated to the creation, promotion, appreciation and education of the fine art of the medal."

Alexander Wood 

Of his body of works, Newbigging's most notable contribution is his monumental statue of the late Alexander Wood, a merchant and magistrate in the city of York (now Toronto).

Set in the Church-Wellesley neighborhood, the bronze sculpture of Alexander Wood is posted at the Church Street and Alexander Street intersection. It was officially unveiled on Saturday May 28, 2005.

"It’s a symbol for any minority community that has struggled and fought to be accepted for their place and home in our city," said Dennis O’Connor, the former Church-Wellesley BIA chair, at the unveiling ceremony.

Newbigging's statue of Wood came after a two year process of development. The two-and-a-half-metre-tall bronze figure was formed almost entirely from that which Newbigging visualized Wood's physical appearance to be, with his prime reference said to have been a mere a silhouette of Wood.

"Del Newbigging’s legacy in Toronto’s gay community is literally set not in stone, but rather in a cast of bronze," Toronto City Councillor Kristyn Wong-Tam told the press. "His meticulous planning and confident execution of Canada’s only monument to a gay pioneer will forever stand proudly over the Church and Wellesley Village. We have Del to thank for this superb contribution to the community."

References 

1934 births
2012 deaths
Canadian gay artists
Artists from Ontario
Canadian male artists
People from Perth County, Ontario
Canadian children's writers
Canadian gay writers
Writers from Ontario
Canadian illustrators
20th-century Canadian sculptors
21st-century Canadian sculptors
20th-century Canadian male writers
21st-century Canadian male writers
21st-century Canadian LGBT people
20th-century Canadian male artists
21st-century Canadian male artists